Francis Ambrière (27 September 1907 – 1 July 1998) was a French author who was selected for the Prix Goncourt in 1940, for his book Les Grandes Vacances; the prize was awarded in 1946 because of World War II. He was born in Paris.

Biography
Francis Ambriere has been recognised for his novel Les Grandes Vacances, which chronicles the lives of French prisoners of war in 1940. He was the author of several Guides bleus for example in Paris in 1949, and then Greece in 1957, or on Italy published in 1960.

Works
 Joachim du Bellay, Firmin-Didot et cie, 1930
 Estaunié, John Charpentier, Francis Ambrière, Firmin-Didot et cie, 1932
 Les grandes vacances, 1939-1945, Les Éditions de la nouvelle France, 1946, (reprint Éditions du Seuil, 1956)
 The long holiday Translator Elaine P. Halperin, Publisher Ziff-Davis Pub. Co., 1948
 Le solitaire de la Cervara, V. Attinger, 1947
 The exiled, Staples Press, 1951
 Le Maroc, Les Documents d'art, 1952
 Théâtre et collectivité, Flammarion, 1953
 Le Siecle des Valmore, Seuil, 1987 
 Mademoiselle Mars et Marie Dorval: au théâtre et dans la vie, Seuil, 1992
 Talma, ou l'histoire au théâtre, Madeleine Ambrière, Francis Ambrière, Éditions de Fallois, 2007,

References

1907 births
1998 deaths
Writers from Paris
Prix Goncourt winners
20th-century French novelists
20th-century French male writers
French male novelists